Linda Tracey Brandon is an American representational painter who paints portraits and the human figure in addition to creating works in other genres, such as still life and landscape.

Early life and education

Brandon was born in Michigan in 1955 and is a graduate of the University of Michigan and New York University School of Law. She received an honor award for her work in hand-drawn animated films as part of her undergraduate studies. Brandon later worked as a radio news reporter for WUOM-FM in Ann Arbor, Michigan, and as a television reporter and anchorwoman for WILX-TV in Jackson, Michigan. She also worked as a lawyer in New York City.

She is the author of the children's book The Little Flower Girl.

Brandon is the grandniece of British silent movie director and actor Bert Tracy.

She studied under several representational/realist drawing and painting teachers through the years. In New York, she took an illustration course at the Parsons New School for Design. After a move to Arizona, she took classes at the Scottsdale Artists' School, where she periodically teaches painting and drawing.

Selected awards and recognition

Exceptional Merit Award, Portrait Society of America 2005 International Competition
Certificate of Excellence, Portrait Society of America 2006 International Competition
Featured Artist, "Member Spotlight," Journal of the Portrait Society of America, issue No. 64, Third Quarter 2014
"Artist to Watch," Southwest Art Magazine, March 2015
Finalist, The Artist's Magazine 2015, 2014, 2001 and 1999 Annual Art Competitions (Portrait/Figure Category)
"A Sense of Dialogue," Article on the painting "Read to Me", American Art Collector, June 2016
Fifth Place, 2019 Lore Degenstein Gallery Annual Figurative Drawing and Painting Competition and Exhibit, Susquehanna University, Selinsgrove, PA
Finalist, 2018/2019, 2016/2017, 2015/2016, 2013/2014 and 2012/2013 International Art Renewal Center (ARC) Salon Competitions
First Prize, 2014 Butler Institute of American Art's 78th Annual Midyear Exhibition, Youngstown, OH 
Semifinalist, Outwin Boochiver Portrait Competition 2016, National Portrait Gallery, Washington DC

Group juried shows 

2016, 2015 "Contemporary Figuration" Group Juried Shows, Abend Gallery, Denver, CO 
2016 "Animalia" Group Juried Show, Abend Gallery, Denver, CO
2016 Butler Institute of American Art's 80th Midyear Exhibition, Youngstown, OH
2018 and 2016 Lore Degenstein Gallery Annual Figurative Drawing and Painting Competitions and Exhibits, Susquehanna University, Selinsgrove, PA
2017 "Sight Unseen" Group Juried Show, Abend Gallery, Denver, CO
2017 University of Oklahoma, National Weather Center Biennale, Norman, OK
2018 Women Painting Women 7 Artist Invitational Show, Customs House Museum & Cultural Center, Clarksville, TN

References

External links
Linda Tracey Brandon's website

Living people
1955 births
University of Michigan alumni
New York University School of Law alumni
20th-century American women artists
21st-century American women artists
American radio journalists
American television reporters and correspondents
American television news anchors